Prospect Park may refer to:

Businesses
 Prospect Park (production company), entertainment production company
Prospect Park Productions NZ, theatre company based in Dunedin, New Zealand

Places

New Zealand
 Prospect Park, New Zealand, common name for a portion of Maori Hill suburb, Dunedin, New Zealand

United Kingdom
 Prospect Park, Reading, a park in Reading, Berkshire, United Kingdom

United States
 Prospect Park (Brooklyn)
 Prospect Park, Pasadena, California
 Prospect Park (Holyoke, Massachusetts)
 Prospect Park (Ypsilanti, Michigan) or Pulaski Park
 Prospect Park, Minneapolis
 Prospect Park, Mercer County, New Jersey, a neighborhood in Ewing Township
 Prospect Park, New Jersey, a borough in Passaic County, New Jersey
 Prospect Park (Troy, New York)
 Prospect Park, Cameron County, Pennsylvania
 Prospect Park, Pennsylvania, a borough in Delaware County, Pennsylvania

See also
 Prospect Park station (disambiguation)
 Prospect Park Historic District (disambiguation)